Force Majeure is the title of a stand-up comedy tour by Eddie Izzard that began in Austria in March 2013. It continued through the UK, Ireland, Russia, South Africa, Canada, Spain, and the United States through the summer of 2014.

The tour was resumed as Force Majeure Reloaded in 2016. During this tour, Izzard delivered a number of performances completely in a language other than her native English, namely French, German, and Spanish. For a series of U.K. performances in May and June 2016 entitled "Force Majeure 3:3:3", each night she in fact performed three separate shows in three languages (German, French, and English, respectively) over three continuous one-hour time slots.

Izzard claims that she has set an "unofficial comedy world record" by ultimately appearing in 45 countries and all 50 U.S. states over the course of the four-year tour. This latter goal was finally accomplished when Izzard performed in Honolulu on 8 March 2017.

References

Eddie Izzard
Comedy tours
Eddie Izzard albums
Spoken word albums by English artists
Events at Malmö Arena